Dhirendra Krishna Shastri (born Dhirendra Krishna Shukla, 4 July 1996) also known as Bageshwar Dham Sarkar is an  Indian epic narrator (Katha Vachak) and a Hindu Spiritual Leader popularly known as Bageshwar Dham Maharaj. Shastri is the Peethadhishwar of the Bageshwar Dham Sarkar, a famous religious pilgrimage site in Chhatarpur district of Madhya Pradesh state of India.

Early years

Family 
Born on the 4 July 1996 in Gada village of  Chhatarpur district. He was the eldest of two children to Saroj Garg (mother) and Ram Kripal Garg (father). Shastri's childhood was one of extreme poverty; his family lived in a kutcha house; as a child he used to narrate stories to people in his village.

Education 
Shastri completed his schooling from a government school in his locality and completed a degree of Bachelor of Arts.

Spirituality 
Dhirendra Krishna was born and brought up in a Hindu Saryuparin Brahmin Family where his father works as a priest. Reportedly Shastri was instructed by Lord Hanuman to become the Peethadhiswar of Bageshwar Dham Sarkar and work for social service. According to him he is an ordinary man and not a Self styled god man, he identifies him neither a god nor a tantric.

Bageshwar Dham Sarkar 
Shastri is serving as a Peethadhishwar and Chief of Bageshwar Dham Sarkar, a Hindu Pilgrimage Site dedicated to lord Hanuman in the Gada Village of Chattarpur District, Madhya Pradesh. The Chief Deity of Dham is believed to be self styled, Shastri organizes a Divya Durbar where it is believed that he heals all physical, mental, economic and social suffering of people with his divine powers which he got from Lord Hanuman. In an interview with the Lallantop Shastri told that he is the third generation serving as the Chief of Dham after his Grandfather and father.

Controversy 
He came into focus when a person named Shyam Manav of All India Andhashraddha Nirmulan Samiti of  Nagpur challenged him in his Divya Darbar and questioned his spiritual powers, Manav also allege Shastri of promoting blind faith. When the controversy erupted in Media, Shastri invited Manav to his Divya Darbar and said,“I am just a servant at the feet of Bageshwar Balaji. I do as he inspires me”. Many prominent Hindu Religious leaders like Swami Ramdev, Sadguru Jaggi Vasudev, Rambhadracharya, Sadhvi Prachi, Pragya Thakur and Politician Giriraj Singh came in his support. He also got support from Akhil Bharatiya Akhara Parishad He is known to revert around 300 Hindus turned Christian in Chhattisgarh. On January 20, 2023 around 500,000 people came to his Divya Darbar. On January 22, 2023 several Hindu organizations called out a protest at Jantar Mantar in New Delhi in support of Bageshwar Dham Sarkar's Chief Pontiff Shastri. On January 25, 2023 the Nagpur Police gave a clean chit to Dhirendra Shastri against an allegation of promoting superstitious activities in his public programmes in Nagpur. Police Commissioner Amitesh Kumar said that during an inquiry into the complaint and the examination of “evidence” submitted by complainant Shyam Manav, founder of ‘Akhil Bharatiya Andhashraddha Nirmoolan Samiti’, nothing was found that could attract action under the Maharashtra Anti-Superstition & Black Magic Act.

On Shastri's Hindu Rashtra remarks AIMIM Chief Asaduddin Owaisi said How can a Hindu nation be made? ,there is a constitution in this country and the country is governed by the constitution. While the Uttar Pradesh Chief Minister Yogi Adityanath endorsed his remarks and said that India is already a Hindu Rashtra and Akhand Bharat will come true.

Religious career 
Shastri is the disciple of Rambhadracharya. He is currently serving as the Peethadhishwar and Head of Bageshwar Dham Sarkar, a Hindu Pilgrimage Site in the Chattarpur District of Madhya Pradesh. Shastri is known for his preaching of Ramcharitmanas and Shiva Purana. He claims to have some charismatic powers achieved through Sadhana by his followers. He has established Annapurna Kitchen in his Dham where free food offerings are arranged for his followers. Dhirendra Shastri also holds annual function of marriage of poor and destitute girls. He is establishing a Vedic Gurukul for promoting ancient Vedic studies and Sanskrit. Reportedly, Shastri brought 300 people converted to Christianity back into Hinduism during a Gharwapsi program in 2021. On January 25,2023 Government of Madhya Pradesh increased the security of Shastri following the death threats received by him. On the birth anniversary of Netaji Subhash Chandra Bose on January 23 Shastri gave a slogan "Give us your Support, We will give Hindu Rashtra"  to declare India as a Hindu nation. He also urged to declare Ramcharitmanas as the National Book of India.
In Rajat Sharma's Aapki Adalat Show Shastri said that he respects all religions and is not against any religion but will not tolerate objectionable remarks against his religion. He also said that he will continue to raise the demand of Hindu Rashtra and Akhand Bharat

References 

1996 births
Living people
People from Madhya Pradesh
Indian Hindus